Neoeridotrypella is an extinct genus of bryozoan of the family Eridotrypellidae, known from the Permian period. Its colonies were typically branching or tree-shaped though sometimes encrusting or massive, and the walls of its zooecial chambers were thicker within the exozone and full of tiny tubules.

Species
Neoeridotrypella pulchra (Morozova, 1970) was the first Neoeridotrypella species described.
Neoeridotrypella schilti (1997)
Neoeridotrypella missionensis (2000) formed only encrusting colonies, which sometimes encrusted upon other bryozoans.

References

Prehistoric bryozoan genera